Hopewell is an unincorporated community in Claiborne County, Tennessee, United States. It lies at an elevation of 1,575 feet (480 m).

References

Unincorporated communities in Claiborne County, Tennessee
Unincorporated communities in Tennessee